The Angry Hills (1955) is a novel written by the American novelist Leon Uris. It was adapted into a motion picture by the same name in 1959.

Michael "Mike" Morrison is an American author and recent widower who is in Greece during World War II to receive an inheritance.  When everything is almost finished, the Greek lawyer asks him to take a letter to a friend in London.  Soon everything is turned into a living Hell to Morrison as the Germans invade Greece and the letter turns out to be of extreme importance to the resistance movement.

Adaptation
In the movie version, set in Athens, in Piraeus and in village areas, Mike is played by Robert Mitchum, as a journalist. He happens to have met a leading figure of the Hellenic resistance movement years earlier and now that gentleman sees him as the means to get the list of useful Hellenic figures to British Intelligence.

Along the way he joins resistance fighters keen to liberate their nation from Nazi oppression but must also deal with at least one British traitor named Bluey and several Greek traitors or collaborators.

References

1955 American novels
American historical novels
Novels by Leon Uris
Random House books
Novels set in Greece during World War II
American novels adapted into films

sv:Mitlapasset